State Route 46 (abbreviated SR 46) is part of Maine's system of numbered state highways, located in the central coastal part of the state. Its southern terminus is located on the Orland—Bucksport town line at U.S. Route 1, State Route 3 and State Route 15. Its northern terminus is located east of Eddington at State Route 9.

Route description
SR 46 begins at an intersection with US 1, SR 3, and SR 15 on the town line between Orland and Bucksport.  It runs almost directly on the border for  before turning northward into Bucksport.  SR 41 crosses through the western edge of Dedham and then the eastern edge of Holden, where it crosses US 1A.  SR 41 crosses into Eddington where it runs along the east side of the Holbrook and Davis Ponds before reaching its northern terminus at SR 9.

History
The entirety of SR 46 used to be part of SR 175 as first designated in 1925.  In 1960, SR 175 was truncated to its current northern terminus in Orland and its concurrency with US 1 / SR 3 / SR 15 was eliminated.  The remainder of its northern segment was renumbered SR 46.

Junction list

References

046
Transportation in Hancock County, Maine
Transportation in Penobscot County, Maine